Erik Blomqvist may refer to:

 Erik Blomqvist (athlete) (1896–1967), Swedish athlete in the javelin throw and the shot put
 Erik Blomqvist (sport shooter) (1879–1956), Swedish sport shooter
 Erik Blomqvist (chess player) (born 1990), Swedish chess player